"I Just Wish You Were Someone I Love" is a song written and recorded by American country music artist Larry Gatlin.  It was released in November 1977 as the fourth single from the album Love Is Just a Game.  The song was Gatlin's sixth and most successful single on the country chart.  The single went to number one on the country chart, where it stayed for a single week and spent a total of eleven weeks on the country chart.

Chart performance

References

1977 singles
1977 songs
Larry Gatlin songs
Monument Records singles
Songs written by Larry Gatlin